Graphicomassa  margarita, common name rice shells, Hawaiian name laiki, is a species of small sea snail in the family Columbellidae, the dove snails. The shells of this species are used to make Leis in Hawaii.

References

 Severns M. (2011) Shells of the Hawaiian Islands - The Sea Shells. Conchbooks, Hackenheim. 564 pp.

Columbellidae
Niihau
Gastropods described in 1859